Duke Hui of Jin (died 637BC), born Yiwu, was the duke of Jin (.650–637BC) during the Spring and Autumn Period of China's Zhou dynasty.

Life

Early life
Yiwu was one of the nine sons of Duke Xian. His mother was Xiao Rongzi. He was the younger sibling of Shensheng and Chong'er (later Duke Wen) and the older sibling of Xiqi.

As part of her scheme to secure the succession to her son, the concubine Li Ji removed Xiqi's older siblings from the capital on the pretext of pacifying their territories. Prince Yiwu was sent to defend Erqu in what is now Ji County, Shanxi.

After the death of Duke Xian in the ninth lunar month during 651BC, Li Ji placed the 15-year-old Xiqi on the throne and made Xun Xi  chancellor to help him with administration. In the tenth lunar month of 651BC, before Duke Xian had even been properly buried, a Jin minister named Li Ke  killed Xiqi. The chancellor Xun Xi then placed Zhuozi, the youngest son of Duke Xian, on the throne even though he was still just a toddler at that time. Xun Xi then finished the burial of Duke Xian. In the eleventh lunar month of 651BC, Li Ke killed Zhuozi and his aunt Li Ji. Xun Xi then committed suicide by hanging himself. Shao Ji  the younger sister of Li Ji and mother of Zhuozi, was imprisoned.

Li Ke first invited Prince Chong'er (then in the State of Qi) to return to Jin to become the next duke. After Chong'er declined, Li Ke extended the same offer to his younger brother Prince Yiwu, then in the State of Liang. Yiwu accepted and was enthroned as the next duke of Jin.

As duke
As duke, Yiwu sentenced Li Ke to commit suicide to atone for his role in the deaths of his two predecessors.

In the fourth year of his reign (647BC), Jin experienced a famine and requested that the State of Qin sell some of its grain. Duke Mu of Qin agreed and sold the grain to Jin.

In the fifth year of his reign (646BC), Qin experienced a famine but Yiwu refused to sell any grain to them, despite its assistance the year before and the advice of the minister Qing Zheng . Enraged, Duke Mu invaded Jin's territory in Han. Prior to battle, Yiwu refused to let Qing Zheng drive his chariot. When it became stuck in the mud during the battle, Yiwu then demanded that Qing Zheng help him; instead, the minister simply walked away. Liang Yao  then attempted to free the chariot while Guo She  protected the duke, even attacking Duke Mu. In the end, the Jin troops fled in retreat and Yiwu was captured and taken as a captive back to Qin. On the day that he was to be killed as an offering to the gods, his half-sister Bo Ji  wept and wore mourning clothes. Her husband Duke Mu admonished her and told her that the capture of the enemy of their state should be celebrated. He then repeated a story he had heard that the famous politician Jizi had once praised the Jin patriarch Shu Yu, saying that his descendants would thrive and be prosperous. He agreed to spare Yiwu's life, escorting him back to Jin and forming an alliance with Jin in the eleventh lunar month.

Restored to power, Yiwu immediately killed Qing Zheng and reordered the government of Jin. Because many of his ministers held his older brother in affection and were open to the idea of a change in leadership, Yiwu sent assassins to the Di tribe  of the northern Rong  to kill him. Prince Chong'er and his attendants heard about this, however, and escaped to Qi.

In the eighth year of his reign (643BC), he sent his son Crown Prince Yu to Qin as a hostage.

In 641BC, Duke Mu invaded Liang, the small state which had once sheltered Yiwu. The count had been attempting to massively fortify his capital but construction was not complete, his people were tired and dissatisfied from their forced work, and Qin was able to conquer them easily.

In the thirteenth year of his reign (638BC), Yiwu grew gravely ill. Crown Prince Yu and his wife Huai Ying  heard of this and fled their captivity in Qin, arriving in Jin before the duke had died. In the ninth lunar month of the fourteenth year of his reign (637BC), Yiwu died and was posthumously entitled Duke Hui of Jin ("The Benevolent Duke of Jin"). Crown Prince Yu ascended the throne, later becoming known as Duke Huai.

References

Monarchs of Jin (Chinese state)
7th-century BC Chinese monarchs
637 BC deaths
Year of birth unknown